Scott Douglas Jordan (born 19 July 1975) is an English former professional footballer who played as a midfielder in the Football League for York City.

Early life
Jordan was born in Newcastle upon Tyne, Tyne and Wear.

Career
Jordan played for York City when they beat Manchester United 3–0 at Old Trafford in the League Cup in September 1995. He also played in the return leg at Bootham Crescent, scoring what proved to be the decisive goal in a 3–1 defeat that nevertheless saw York progress to the next round on aggregate.

References

External links

1975 births
Living people
Footballers from Newcastle upon Tyne
English footballers
Association football midfielders
York City F.C. players
Scarborough F.C. players
English Football League players
National League (English football) players